Henri ("Harry") Léonard Barthélémi Dénis (28 August 1896 – 13 July 1971) was a football defender from the Netherlands, who represented his home country at three consecutive Summer Olympics, starting in 1920.

Club career
Dénis started playing football with local side DVV and joined HBS aged 11. He would stay at the club for the rest of his career, winning the 1925 Netherlands Football League Championship with them.

International career
At his Olympic debut in Antwerp, Belgium he won the bronze medal with the Netherlands national football team, followed by a fourth place four years later in Paris, France. Dénis obtained a total number of 56 caps for the Netherlands, in which he was captain in 37 matches. He was one of the most prominent Dutch footballers in the 1920s. Dénis delivered the Olympic Oath during the opening ceremony of the 1928 Summer Olympics in Amsterdam.

Dénis held the Dutch caps record from 3 May 1925 (when he equaled the total of Bok de Korver) until 2 May 1937 (when his total was surpassed by Puck van Heel).

References

External links
 
ING – Den Haag. Bronvermelding: A. Lammers, 'Dénis, Henri Léonard Barthélémi (1896–1971)', in Biografisch Woordenboek van Nederland.

1896 births
1971 deaths
Footballers from The Hague
Association football fullbacks
Dutch footballers
Netherlands international footballers
Footballers at the 1920 Summer Olympics
Footballers at the 1924 Summer Olympics
Footballers at the 1928 Summer Olympics
Olympic footballers of the Netherlands
Olympic bronze medalists for the Netherlands
Olympic medalists in football
Medalists at the 1920 Summer Olympics
HBS Craeyenhout players
Oath takers at the Olympic Games